is an independent movie theater in the city of Ise, Mie Prefecture, Japan.

History 
It opened under the name  as a playhouse in Ujiyamada city, Mie Prefecture in 1927. Shintomiza shifted from playhouse to movie theater in 1953. Ise Écrin changed to current name in 2002.

It is one of the only independent movie theaters in Japan that is not located in a major metropolis. Shintomiza has 2 screens.

References

External links
 
 

Cinemas in Japan